Katia Tchenko (born 8 May 1947) is a French actress. She has appeared in more than 100 films and television shows since 1967.  In 1999 she was a member of the jury at the 21st Moscow International Film Festival.

Filmography

Theater

References

External links

1947 births
Living people
French film actresses
People from Versailles
20th-century French actresses
21st-century French actresses
Knights of the Ordre national du Mérite